Zylka or  Žyłka is a Polish-language surname. It may refer to:
 Chris Zylka (1985), American actor and model
 Ferdinand Zylka (1998), German basketball player
 Uładzimir Žyłka (1900–1933), Belarusian poet.

See also
 Żyła

Polish-language surnames
Surnames from nicknames